Elvis for Everyone! is the eighth studio album by American singer and musician Elvis Presley, issued by RCA Victor in mono and stereo, LPM/LSP 3450, on August 10, 1965. Recording sessions took place over a ten-year span at Sun Studio in Memphis, RCA Studio B in Nashville, Tennessee, and Radio Recorders in Hollywood, California. It peaked at number 10 on the Top Pop Albums chart.

Background
Sessions in late May 1963 failed to coalesce into his fifth studio album of the 1960s, and by 1965 Presley's musical output had been focused exclusively on his movie career and soundtrack output. He had not released a proper studio album since Pot Luck in June 1962, although seven non-movie singles had been issued since (though several of them had featured recording session outtakes dating back as early as 1958). RCA  Victor invented the concept of an "Anniversary Album" to celebrate Presley's tenth year with the label, which became Elvis For Everyone.  The album's cover depicting Presley standing next to the RCA Victor trademark Nipper the dog, sitting atop a cash register. Since May 1963, Presley had only made one non-movie session in January 1964 that yielded a mere three tracks, two of which had already been issued as sides for singles. Bereft of new material, RCA Victor  assembled this album from unused tracks going all the way back to the Sun Records years, from sessions for both soundtracks and regular commercial releases. Possibly owing to its assembly from scraps and rejects, although it made the top ten on the LP chart, it was the first Presley album to sell fewer than 300,000 copies during the decade, but later would be certified Gold in the U.S. by the RIAA.

Content
Of the tracks on Elvis for Everyone! only "Summer Kisses, Winter Tears," recorded for but not used in the film Flaming Star, had previously been issued, on the extended play single Elvis by Request: Flaming Star and 3 Other Great Songs. Several tracks had appeared on film, but had not been issued on record before. "In My Way" had appeared in the 1961 film Wild in the Country, "Sound Advice" in the 1962 film Follow That Dream, and the traditional Neapolitan ballad "Santa Lucia" in the 1964 outing Viva Las Vegas. The remaining eight tracks had been unissued in any form. The Sun ballad "Tomorrow Night" had overdubs added for release on this album; it would not be officially issued in its original form for another two decades with the compilation Reconsider Baby in 1985.

RCA had intended to include the unreleased Sun Records track "Tennessee Saturday Night," but withdrew it from the album and replaced it with "Tomorrow Night". Neither has reference to a Presley Sun recording with this title ever been mentioned in any other source, nor has a Presley Sun recording with this title ever been discovered, although a  song entitled "Tennessee Saturday Night" was slated for Loving You but not recorded.

In its format as a compilation of mostly unissued leftovers from various sessions, and given its rather short running time, this album anticipated the Presley budget releases with a similar concept that would appear during the late 1960s and early 1970s on the low priced RCA Camden label. RCA opted not to include it as part of its reissue program, appending its songs as bonus tracks to other albums as appropriate, with the overdubbed version of "Tomorrow Night" being ultimately replaced by the original Sun Records master version in general circulation.

Reissues
In 2014 Elvis for Everyone  was reissued on the Follow That Dream label in a special 2-disc edition that contained the original album tracks along with numerous alternate takes from other albums and singles.

Track listing

Original release

2014 Follow That Dream CD reissue

Personnel

 Elvis Presley – vocals, guitar
 Scotty Moore – rhythm guitar, lead guitar on "Your Cheatin' Heart", "Tomorrow Night" and "When It Rains, It Really Pours"
 Tiny Timbrell – guitar
 Howard Roberts – guitar on “Summer Kisses, Winter Tears”
 Hank Garland – guitar on “Sound Advice”
 Neal Matthews, Jr. – guitar
 Chet Atkins - overdubbed lead guitar on "Tomorrow Night"
 Harold Bradley – guitar
 Grady Martin – lead guitar on "Memphis, Tennessee"
 Billy Strange – lead guitar on "Santa Lucia"
 Jerry Kennedy – lead guitar on "Finders Keepers, Losers Weepers"
 Dudley Brooks – piano
 Floyd Cramer – piano
 Jimmie Haskell – accordion
 Gordon Stoker – accordion
 Bill Black – double bass on "Your Cheatin' Heart", "Tomorrow Night" and "When It Rains, It Really Pours"
 Meyer Rubin – double bass
 Bob Moore – double bass
 D. J. Fontana – drums
 Bernie Mattinson – drums
 Buddy Harman – drums
 Boots Randolph – saxophone, clarinet
 The Jordanaires – backing vocals
 Millie Kirkham – backing vocals

Charts
Album

References

External links

Albums produced by Steve Sholes
Elvis Presley albums
1965 albums
RCA Records albums
Albums recorded at Sun Studio
Albums produced by Chet Atkins
Albums produced by Sam Phillips
Albums produced by Hans J. Salter
Albums produced by Greg Stoll